The Kivu giant pouched rat (Cricetomys kivuensis) is a species of rodent in the family Nesomyidae.

Taxonomy 
It was formerly considered conspecific with the Emin's pouched rat (C. emini), but is now considered its own species.

Distribution
It is found in central Africa, in the Democratic Republic of the Congo, Uganda, Rwanda, and Burundi.

References

Further reading

Cricetomys
Rodents of Africa
Mammals described in 1917